The Shropshire Premier League was an English association football league based in the county of Shropshire. It was formed as the Mercian Regional Football League for the 2012–13 season, with all member clubs of the dissolved Shropshire County Premier Football League (except for Newport Town who were promoted) transferring membership across. Several teams from the Telford Combination, which also folded at the end of the 2011–12 season, also became members of the Mercian League and joined either Division One or Two.

The league sits at the same levels of the English football league system as the previous Shropshire County and Telford Combination leagues did (levels 13, 14 and 15). It does not, however, form part of the National League System.

Due to the revised English FA rule permitting clubs to play outside of their County the league has lost a number of clubs in recent years, with clubs citing frustrations with the league's hierarchy and also promised plans to improve upon the level it features amongst the FA pyramid being deciding factors. Clubs such as Church Stretton, Rock Rovers, AFC Bridgnorth Reserves (Development) all left for the West Midlands Regional League Div 2. Newport Town Reserves and Market Drayton Tigers joined Staffordshire County Div 2, with Ludlow Town Colts and Clee Hill United opting to join the Herefordshire league. In these years the league also lost established members such as Hodnet, Shifnal and Childs Ercall due to them folding. The league now just features one division of 11 teams, soon to become 10 due to Donnington folding midway through the 2018-19 season.

Member clubs 2019–20
In the 2018-19 season, the Premier Division consisted of 11 teams.

Premier Division

League champions
The following teams have won the Premier Division, gaining promotion to West Midlands (Regional) League Division Two.

See also
Shropshire Football Association
Shropshire#Football
Shropshire County Premier Football League

References

External links
Official league tables and statistics FA Full-time

 
Football in Shropshire
Defunct football leagues in England
Sports leagues established in 2012
2012 establishments in England
Sports leagues disestablished in 2020
2020 disestablishments in England